Alan van Heerden (11 December 1954 in Johannesburg – 15 December 2009) was a South African cyclist. He was the first ever South African to win a stage of a Grand Tour.

He was killed in a car accident in 2009 at the age of 56.

Major results
1978
3rd Paris-Roubaix Espoirs
1979
1st Stage 7 Giro d'Italia

References

1954 births
2009 deaths
South African male cyclists
South African Giro d'Italia stage winners
Cyclists from Johannesburg